Rusher may refer to:

Sports
 any football player who rushes
 List of NFL rushing yards leaders
 List of NFL rushing champions
 List of NFL teams with multiple 1000 yard rushers

People
 Brandy Rusher, model and contestant on America's Next Top Model
 Daniel Ruczko, a.k.a. Rusher, German film director and music producer
 Jack Rusher, American Olympic rower
 Masao Kimura, a.k.a. Rusher Kimura, Japanese professional wrestler
 Matt Bloom, a.k.a. Rusher Road, American professional wrestler
 Rusher Itamae, Japanese comedian
 William A. Rusher, political columnist and one of the founders of the American conservative movement

Other
 Rusher Hotel, a.k.a. the Great Southern Hotel, a historic hotel in Brinkley, Arkansas
 A loyal fan of The Morning Rush, a Philippine weekday morning radio show